Zhang Guangning (born 1953 in Jiangsu) was the 14th Mayor of Guangzhou, Guangdong province, China, and later Party Secretary of Guangzhou.

Biography
He holds a Masters in the Philosophy of Law and an MBA and graduated from the elite party school of the CPC central committee. He has served as secretary of the CYLC branch in the work section of Guangzhou Steel Works, deputy secretary and secretary of the CPC Committee of Guangzhou Steel Works, and director of the training center of Guangzhou Steel Works until 1996, when he was elected deputy mayor of Guangzhou.

He was elected deputy to the 10th National People's Congress, deputy to the 7th and 8th People's Congress of Guangdong province, and deputy to the 11th and 12th People's Congress of Guangzhou Municipality.  He serves as Vice President of the China Association of Mayors.  Guangzhou will also host the 16th Asian Games in 2010, for which Zhang is the secretary-general.

In 2007 he became co-president of the United Cities and Local Governments organisation and was longlisted for the 2008 World Mayor award.

References

External links
 Profile on Guangzhou government website
 CityMayors profile
 UCLG biography
 China Vitae entry

1953 births
Living people
Regional leaders in the People's Republic of China
Mayors of Guangzhou
People's Republic of China politicians from Shandong
Politicians from Binzhou
Chinese Communist Party politicians from Shandong
Delegates to the 10th National People's Congress
Delegates to the 11th National People's Congress